Triathlon at the Pacific Games was first contested at the 1995 games at Papeete. It has also been included in the Pacific Mini Games, firstly at Norfolk Island in 2001.

The Sprint format (half the Olympic distance) has been used for triathlons at the Pacific Games since 2011. Prior to that, the standard course Olympic distance was raced. The Aquathon, with swim and run legs only, has also been contested.

Pacific Games
Flag icons and three letter country code indicate the nationality of the gold medal winner of an event, where this information is known; otherwise an (X) is used. Moving the cursor onto a country code with a dotted underline will reveal the name of the gold medal winner. A dash (–) indicates an event that was not contested.

Winners

Medal table
These are the all time medal standings for triathlon and aquathon events at the Pacific Games up to and including the 2019 games:

Pacific Mini Games

Past winners

Medal tally
These are the all time medal standings for triathlon and aquathon at the Pacific Mini Games up to and including 2009:

Notes

References

Sources

 
Pacific Games
Pacific Games